The name Astyoche (Ancient Greek: Ἀστυόχη means 'possessor of the city') or Astyocheia  was attributed to the following individuals in Greek mythology:

Astyoche, naiad daughter of the river god Simoeis, mother of Tros by Erichthonius.
Astyoche, a Trojan princess as the daughter of King Laomedon by Strymo, Placia or Leucippe, sister of Priam, wife of Telephus and mother of Eurypylus (some call her daughter of Priam and wife of Eurypylus). She was bribed by Priam with a gold vine to persuade Eurypylus to go to the Trojan War, which resulted in him being killed in the battle (cf. the story of Eriphyle). Together with Aethilla and Medesicaste, she was taken captive after the sack of Troy and set fire to the Greek ships during their stay on the Italian coast.
Astyoche, a Minyan princess as the daughter of King Actor of Orchomenus, son of Azeus. She was the mother of Ascalaphus and Ialmenus with Ares. The latter lay with her in secret when the maiden entered into her upper chamber.
Astyoche, sister of Agamemnon and Menelaus. She married Strophius, and became the mother of Pylades. She is also known as Anaxibia or Cydragora.
Astyoche, a daughter of King Phylas of Ephyra, mother of Tlepolemus by Heracles. Also known as Astydameia or Astygeneia.
Astyoche, wife of Phylacus, mother of Protesilaus and Podarces. These two are otherwise known as grandsons of Phylacus through Iphiclus.
Astyoche, one of the Niobids.
Astyoche, mother of Pentheus, otherwise known as Agave.
Astyoche, daughter of Itylus and possible mother of Ajax the Lesser.
Astyoche, mother of Euryalus by Mecisteus.
Astyoche, a nymph and one of the Danaids who was called the mother of Chrysippus by Pelops.

Notes

References 

 Apollodorus, The Library with an English Translation by Sir James George Frazer, F.B.A., F.R.S. in 2 Volumes, Cambridge, MA, Harvard University Press; London, William Heinemann Ltd. 1921. ISBN 0-674-99135-4. Online version at the Perseus Digital Library. Greek text available from the same website.
Dictys Cretensis, from The Trojan War. The Chronicles of Dictys of Crete and Dares the Phrygian translated by Richard McIlwaine Frazer, Jr. (1931-). Indiana University Press. 1966. Online version at the Topos Text Project.
 Gaius Julius Hyginus, Fabulae from The Myths of Hyginus translated and edited by Mary Grant. University of Kansas Publications in Humanistic Studies. Online version at the Topos Text Project.
 Graves, Robert, The Greek Myths, Harmondsworth, London, England, Penguin Books, 1960. 
Graves, Robert, The Greek Myths: The Complete and Definitive Edition. Penguin Books Limited. 2017. 
Hesiod, Catalogue of Women from Homeric Hymns, Epic Cycle, Homerica translated by Evelyn-White, H G. Loeb Classical Library Volume 57. London: William Heinemann, 1914. Online version at theio.com
 Homer, The Iliad with an English Translation by A.T. Murray, Ph.D. in two volumes. Cambridge, MA., Harvard University Press; London, William Heinemann, Ltd. 1924. Online version at the Perseus Digital Library.
 Homer, Homeri Opera in five volumes. Oxford, Oxford University Press. 1920. Greek text available at the Perseus Digital Library.
 Quintus Smyrnaeus, The Fall of Troy translated by Way. A. S. Loeb Classical Library Volume 19. London: William Heinemann, 1913. Online version at theio.com
 Quintus Smyrnaeus, The Fall of Troy. Arthur S. Way. London: William Heinemann; New York: G.P. Putnam's Sons. 1913. Greek text available at the Perseus Digital Library.
 Pausanias, Description of Greece with an English Translation by W.H.S. Jones, Litt.D., and H.A. Ormerod, M.A., in 4 Volumes. Cambridge, MA, Harvard University Press; London, William Heinemann Ltd. 1918. . Online version at the Perseus Digital Library
Pausanias, Graeciae Descriptio. 3 vols. Leipzig, Teubner. 1903.  Greek text available at the Perseus Digital Library.
 Publius Papinius Statius, The Thebaid translated by John Henry Mozley. Loeb Classical Library Volumes. Cambridge, MA, Harvard University Press; London, William Heinemann Ltd. 1928. Online version at the Topos Text Project.
 Publius Papinius Statius, The Thebaid. Vol I-II. John Henry Mozley. London: William Heinemann; New York: G.P. Putnam's Sons. 1928. Latin text available at the Perseus Digital Library.
Tzetzes, John, Allegories of the Iliad translated by Goldwyn, Adam J. and Kokkini, Dimitra. Dumbarton Oaks Medieval Library, Harvard University Press, 2015. 

Children of Potamoi
Princesses in Greek mythology
Trojans
Queens in Greek mythology
Women of Heracles
Women of Ares
Mortal parents of demigods in classical mythology
Minyan characters in Greek mythology
Theban characters in Greek mythology
Thessalian characters in Greek mythology
Locrian mythology